Finguine mac Cathail Con-cen-máthair (died 696) was a King of Munster from the Glendamnach branch of the Eoganachta. He was the son of Cathal Cú-cen-máthair mac Cathaíl (d. 665). He succeeded Colgú mac Faílbe Flaind in 678.

During his reign the law text Cáin Fuithirbe was enacted at Mag Fuithirbe on the borders of Cork and Kerry in 683. Representatives of the major tribes of Munster are mentioned in the tract.

Finguine's known son was Cathal mac Finguine (d. 742) a powerful King of Munster.

He is a recurring character in Peter Tremayne's Sister Fidelma mysteries.

Notes

See also
Kings of Munster

References

Annals of Tigernach
Francis J.Byrne, Irish Kings and High-Kings
The Chronology of the Irish Annals, Daniel P. McCarthy

External links
CELT: Corpus of Electronic Texts at University College Cork

Kings of Munster
696 deaths
7th-century Irish monarchs
Year of birth unknown